Samar Ishaq (born January 1, 1986) is a retired Pakistani professional footballer who formerly played for Khan Research Laboratories, and is the current defending coach of his life-long club Khan Research Laboratories.

Born in Faisalabad, Punjab, Ishaq made his professional debut in 2004–05 Pakistan Premier League with Panther Club, surviving relegation due to Allied Bank folding their team. Ishaq got relegated with Panthers in 2005–06 season. Ishaq joined Khan Research Laboratories at the start of 2006–07 season. With Khan Research Laboratories, Ishaq won four league titles and 6 national cups.

Ishaq made his international debut at the 2005 SAFF Championship, which was hosted in Jinnah Sports Stadium, Islamabad, Pakistan. Ishaq was part of the team that lost to Bangladesh in the semi-finals.

Club career

Panther Club

2004–06
Ishaq started his career at Panther Club from his hometown of Faisalabad. He competed in the 2004–05 Pakistan Premier League with them. Panther finished the season in relegation zone at 11th position with 30 points, but avoided relegation due to Allied Bank who finished on 8th position folded their team at the end of the season.

In the 2005–06, Ishaq faced relegation once again as Panther Club finished 11th again, with 20 points.
Ishaq scored his first goal for Panther Club in a 5–0 victory over City Football Club from Lahore in 2005 National Challenge Cup on 11 June 2005. Ishaq scored the second goal of the match and his team in the 47th minute. Ishaq scored his second goal of the tournament in the 73rd minute against Wohaib, a game which Wohaib drew 2–2 in the last 10 minutes after trailing by 2–0. In the second stage of the tournament, Panther Club ended in the bottom of table and got knocked out of the tournament.

Khan Research Laboratories

2006–2008
Ishaq joined Rawalpindi giants, Khan Research Laboratories before the start of the 2006–07 Pakistan Premier League. Ishaq was a regular in the starting eleven throughout the season as Khan Research Laboratories finished 3rd, conceding only 12 goals in 20 games.

In the 2007–08 season, Ishaq scored his first ever top-flight league goal on 5 January 2008 against Pakistan Airlines, scoring the equaliser after Shakir Lashari gave the lead to Pakistan Airlines in the 11th minute. Khan Research won the game 4–1. Ishaq again ended 3rd with Khan Research Laboratories, as his side had the second best defense of the league behind Pakistan Army, who conceded 10 goals as compared to 13 of Khan Research Laboratories.

The 2008–09 season saw Ishaq winning his first silverware, as Khan Research Laboratories won the 2009 National Football Challenge Cup, defeating Pakistan Airlines 1–0 in the finals, thanks to a 64th-minute goal by Muhammad Qasim. However they finished third in the league again behind league winners and runners-up WAPDA and Pakistan Army respectively.

In 2009–10 season, Ishaq and Khan Research Laboratories won their first ever league national title, as they won the league on goal difference, finishing first with a goal difference of +32 as compared to +22 of Pakistan Army after both teams ended the season with 60 points. Ishaq with his team conceded only 8 goals in 26 matches. He scored his first goal of the season in a 2–0 win over National Bank on 7 August 2009, as he opened the scoring in the 63rd minute. On 4 October 2009, Ishaq scored the lone goal in the 90+1 minute as Khan Research Laboratories defeated Pak Elektron 1–0. 
Ishaq and Khan Research Laboratories went on to achieve the double and they also successfully defended the National Challenge Cup. Ishaq scored the fastest goal of the 2010 National Football Challenge Cup, when he scored the goal in the 2nd minute of the match in the finals, as his team went on to defeat Pakistan Navy 4–0, with Kaleemullah Khan, Zubair Ahmed and Abid Ghafoor scoring in the 22nd, 63rd and 77th minutes respectively.

Ishaq finished second in the 2010–11 Pakistan Premier League after WAPDA topped the league, 9 points clear of Khan Research Laboratories, although Khan Research Laboratories had the best defense of the season conceding only 16 goals in 20 matches. Ishaq scored his only goal of the season against Pakistan Army on 20 September 2010, converting a penalty in the 56th minute. Ishaq however, won his and his team's third consecutive National Challenge Cup title as they defeated Karachi Electric Supply Corporation 1–0 in the finals held at Ishaq's hometown of Faisalabad. Ishaq scored his only goal of the tournament in the group stage in a 2–0 win over Habib Bank.

Ishaq became the captain of Khan Research Laboratories, at the 2011–12 season, as they went on to achieve the double once again, becoming the first team in Pakistan to achieve this feat more than once, as Allied Bank and Crescent Textile Mills did the double in 1999 and 1987 respectively. He won the league as Khan Research Laboratories finished at the top of the table, 20 points clear of surprise runners-up Afghan Chaman. This was the first time in the Pakistan Premier League that the league was won by any team with 6 games remaining to play. Ishaq won the 2012 National Football Challenge Cup 3–1 on penalties after the match stayed 0–0 after extra-time, Ishaq's missed his penalty after hitting the post.

Ishaq won his third league and second consecutive title, as they went on to win the 2012–13 Pakistan Premier League, courtesy of Kaleemullah Khan who scored 35 goals in 30 games, most in the history of Pakistan Premier League. Ishaq scored his first league goal of the season on 5 January 2013, after scoring a penalty in the 77th minute against Karachi Port Trust 2–1. Ishaq missed the decisive penalty in a quarter-finals match against National Bank in the 2013 National Football Challenge Cup, causing them to crash out of the tournament.

International career statistics

Goals for Senior National Team

Honours
Khan Research Laboratories
 Pakistan Premier League: 2009–10, 2011–12, 2012–13, 2013–14
 National Football Challenge Cup: 2009, 2010, 2011, 2012, 2015, 2016

Individual
 Premier League Player of the Year: 2008–09, 2011–12

References

External links

1986 births
Living people
Footballers from Faisalabad
Khan Research Laboratories F.C. players
Pakistani footballers
Pakistan international footballers
Association football fullbacks
Footballers at the 2006 Asian Games
Footballers at the 2010 Asian Games
Asian Games competitors for Pakistan